Drohar Shivadin was an Indian politician and member of the Bharatiya Jana Sangh. Shivadin was a member of the 2nd Lok Sabha from the Hardoi constituency in Uttar Pradesh.

He was born on 1 May 1898 in Gopamau, Hardoi district. He supervisor of education of Depressed Classes and was interests in Reform movement of downtrodden classes.

References 

People from Hardoi district
Bharatiya Jana Sangh politicians
India MPs 1957–1962
Lok Sabha members from Uttar Pradesh
1898 births
Year of death unknown